Doctors and Nurses is a 1981 Australian comedy film directed by Maurice Murphy. The gimmick is child actors play doctors and nurses and adults play patients.

Cast
 Pamela Stephenson as Permanent Wave
 Bert Newton as Mr. Cody
 Richard Meikle as The President
 Graeme Blundell as Mr. X
 Drew Forsythe as Katz
 Andrew McFarlane as Milligan
 Sarah Lambert as Mary Grey

Reception
Filmink magazine later said "I’ve got to say, I used to watch this on VHS when I was eight and remember loving it. I haven’t seen it since I was eight. Amazing cast"

Horror Movie and Goose Flesh
After making the movie, Maurice Murphy and Brian Rosen decided to make a follow up project, shooting two films back to back, Horror Movie and Goose Flesh, budgeted at $500,000 each. The movie had the same plot line but Horror Movie was a straight film whereas Goose Flesh was a comedy. The same cast and crew would be used.

Filming starting in Sydney in April 1981. A scene would be shot straight then re-shot as a comedy. However the film ran out of money and filming stopped after a week. Brian Rosen was left with $700,000 debt.

References

External links
 Doctors and Nurses at IMDb
 Doctors and Nurses at Oz Movies

Australian comedy films
1980s English-language films
1981 films
1981 comedy films
Films directed by Maurice Murphy
1980s Australian films